Justice Irvin may refer to:

William W. Irvin (1779–1842), justice of the Supreme Court of Ohio
David Irvin (1794–1872), justice of the Wisconsin Territorial Supreme Court

See also
Levin Thomas Handy Irving (1828–1892), justice of the Maryland Court of Appeals
Justice Ervin (disambiguation)